Langley is an unincorporated community in Bureau County, Illinois, United States. Langley is located at the junction of U.S. Route 6, U.S. Route 34, and Illinois Route 40. Langley is east of Sheffield and north of Buda.

The community was named after Langley, South Carolina.

References

Unincorporated communities in Bureau County, Illinois
Unincorporated communities in Illinois